Homalocarpus is a genus of flowering plants in the family Apiaceae, found in Chile. They are annual herbs with white, yellow, red or purple flowers.

Species
Currently accepted species include:

Homalocarpus bowlesioides Hook. & Arn.
Homalocarpus dichotomus (Poepp. ex DC.) Mathias & Constance
Homalocarpus digitatus (Phil.) Mathias & Constance
Homalocarpus dissectus Mathias & Constance
Homalocarpus integerrimus (Turcz.) Mathias & Constance
Homalocarpus nigripetalus (Clos) Mathias & Constance

References

Apiaceae
Apiaceae genera